Léontine Stevens (12 August 1907 – 1998) was a Belgian sprinter. She competed in the women's 4 × 100 metres relay at the 1928 Summer Olympics and finished tenth in the women's high jump.

References

External links

1907 births
1998 deaths
Athletes (track and field) at the 1928 Summer Olympics
Belgian female sprinters
Belgian female high jumpers
Olympic athletes of Belgium